This is a list of fellows of the Royal Society elected in its 11th year, 1670.

Fellows 
Gustavus Helmfeld (1651–1674)
Andre Monceaux (b. 1670)

References

1670
1670 in science
1670 in England